James Boyd McIntosh (25 May 1886 – 18 April 1963) was a Scottish footballer who played for Third Lanark, Aberdeen, Celtic, Hull City, Hearts and Dumbarton.

References

1886 births
1963 deaths
Scottish footballers
Footballers from Glasgow
Association football central defenders
Dumbarton F.C. players
Celtic F.C. players
Heart of Midlothian F.C. players
Scottish Football League players
English Football League players
Third Lanark A.C. players
Aberdeen F.C. players
Hull City A.F.C. players
Glasgow Perthshire F.C. players
Petershill F.C. players
Scottish Junior Football Association players
Scots Guards soldiers
British Army personnel of World War I